Harry Smith Trevitt FRCO (5 June 1878 - 1979) was an organist and composer based in England.

Life

He was born in 1879 in Walkden, Lancashire, to Harry Trevitt, journalist.

He was an articled pupil at Lincoln Cathedral. He attained his ARCO in 1899 and his FRCO in 1901.

In 1914 he married Ethel Mary Clark

He died in 1979 in Lincoln, aged 101.

Appointments

Organist of St. Faith's Church, Lincoln ???? - 1897
Organist of Syston Church, Grantham 1897 - ????
Organist of Branston Church ca. 1899
Organist of St. Martin's Church, Lincoln. 1903
Assistant organist of Lincoln Cathedral 1899 - 1903?
Organist of St. Peter in Eastgate, Lincoln 1904-1948

Compositions

He composed organ and church music.

References

1878 births
1979 deaths
English organists
British male organists
English composers
English centenarians
Men centenarians
Fellows of the Royal College of Organists
People from Walkden